A book called Al Taʿrīfāt (التعريفات "The Definitions"), written by Ali ibn Mohammed al-Jurjani (1339–1414), who was a known philosopher, astronomer, theologian, and a linguist. 
The book contains about 2100 definitions of the most important Arabic terms in Philosophy, Logic, Science, Art, and Religion, written in a glossary style, a list of terms and a few lines definition for each term. 
There are several version of this book, among them, and maybe the most common versions was published by Dar Al-Kotob AL-Ilmiyah in Lebanon in 1983.

Suggested translation for referencing: 
Ali ibn Mohammed al-Jurjani: The Definitions (Al Taʿrīfāt).  Dar Al-Kotob AL-Ilmiyah, Beirut, Lebanon, 1983.

References

Islamic theology books
14th-century books